Kerala Forest Department is a law enforcement agency for the state of Kerala, India. Over 75% of the land area of Kerala was covered by forests until the 18th century. The department is involved with the protection and conservation of flora and fauna in their natural habitats. It conserves  of forests forming 29.101% of the total geographic area of the state.

The headquarters of department is in Vazhuthacaud, Thiruvananthapuram, Kerala. It also hosts the Forest Central Library, which is open for public access.

Responsibilities
 Biodiversity conservation
 Forest protection
 Wildlife management and research
 Forest development
 Social forestry
 Forest vigilance and evaluation
 Eco-development and tribal welfare
 Planning and research
 Rehabilitation and special afforestation
 Human resource development

See also
Indian Council of Forestry Research and Education
 Van Vigyan Kendra - Forest Science Centers

References

External links
 Official Website
 Government of Kerala
 Ministry of Environments and Forests, Government of India
 Minister for Kerala Forests and Wildlife
 Kerala Forest Research Institute

Kerala
Forest
Law enforcement in Kerala
Wildlife conservation in India
Environment of Kerala